"Doing It to Death", also known as "Gonna Have a Funky Good Time", is a funk song recorded by  The J.B.'s featuring James Brown. 
A 10-minute, two-part version of "Doing It to Death" was included on a J.B.'s album of the same name. The complete, unedited and nearly 13-minute-long original recording of the song was first issued on the 1995 J.B.'s compilation Funky Good Time: The Anthology. Performances of the song also appear on the albums Live at Chastain Park and Live at the Apollo 1995.

Background
Although the song has a lead vocal by Brown (who also wrote the tune and the lyrics), the recording is credited to "Fred Wesley & The J.B.'s". It was the first J.B.'s recording to feature saxophonist Maceo Parker, who had returned to work with Brown again after attempting a career as a bandleader.

"Doing It to Death" contains an uncommon key change in which Brown tells the band to modulate downward from F to D ("In order for me to get down, I have to get down in D").  Composers who place key changes in tunes typically have them modulate upwards. Unusually for a James Brown song, the actual words "doing it to death" appear nowhere in the song's lyrics, which feature the hook "we're gonna have a funky good time." The title came from a figure of speech Brown heard Wesley use.

Personnel
 James Brown - lead vocal

with Fred Wesley & The J.B.'s:
 Fred Wesley - trombone
 Darryl "Hasaan" Jamison - trumpet
 Jerone "Jasaan" Sanford - trumpet
 Ike Oakley - trumpet
 Maceo Parker - alto saxophone and flute
 St. Clair Pinckney - tenor saxophone
 Eldee Williams - tenor saxophone
 Jimmy Nolen - guitar
 Hearlon "Cheese" Martin - guitar
 Fred Thomas - bass
 John "Jabo" Starks - drums

Chart performance
"Doing It to Death" was released as a single in 1973 and peaked at number one on the soul singles chart and number twenty-two on the Hot 100.

References 

James Brown songs
The J.B.'s songs
Songs written by James Brown
1973 singles
1973 songs